The House at 31 West Cayuga Street in the village of Moravia in Cayuga County, New York is a historic home.  It is a 2-story, frame, Greek Revival-style dwelling with a -story rear wing.  It was built about 1840.

It was listed on the National Register of Historic Places in 1995.

References

External links

Houses on the National Register of Historic Places in New York (state)
Greek Revival houses in New York (state)
Houses in Cayuga County, New York
National Register of Historic Places in Cayuga County, New York
Moravia (village), New York